Ningi may refer to:
Cəmiyyət (Ningi), Azerbaijan
Ningi, Nigeria, a traditional state in northern Nigeria
Ningi, Queensland, a town in Queensland, Australia